Batrelaky  is a music style from southeastearn part of Madagascar especially between Manakara and Farafangana. This musical genre is mainly played with an accordion,
guitar, bass and drums. It is a mostly traditional Malagasy genre.

In gatherings to celebrate it, the multi-ethnic crowds don Firake (for the women) and salaka (for the men).

Famous Artists 
 Bakidy Gegette
 Dat'kotry
 Lôla
 Tata Rahely
 Tinah
 Willy

References 

Malagasy music
Atsimo-Atsinanana
African music genres
Fitovinany